Nkwanta South Municipal Assembly is one of the eight districts in Oti Region, Ghana. Originally it was formerly part of the then-larger Nkwanta District on 10 March 1989, which was established by Legislative Instrument (L.I.) 1496, until the northern part of the district was split off to create Nkwanta North District on 29 February 2008, which was established by Legislative Instrument (L.I.) 1892; thus the remaining part has been renamed to become Nkwanta South District. However, on 14 November 2017 (effectively 15 March 2018), it was later elevated to municipal district assembly status to become Nkwanta South Municipal District; which was established by Legislative Instrument (L.I.) 2283. The municipality is located in the northern part of Oti Region and has Nkwanta as its capital town.

Villages
In addition to Nkwanta, the capital and administrative centre, Nkwanta South Municipality contains the following villages:

Sources
 
 Nkwanta South Municipal District on GhanaDistricts.com

References

External links
 Nkwanta South Municipal District Official Website

Districts of the Oti Region
States and territories established in 2008